FC Zana (Georgian: საფეხბურთო კლუბი ზანა) is a Georgian association football club based in the town of Abasha. They currently compete in Regionuli Liga, the fifth tier of the national league system.

History
The third tier is the highest division where Zana have taken part since the formation of independent Georgian championship in 1990. The team gained promotion to Meore Liga in 2015, although their tenure there lasted two seasons. 

Following the relegation, Zana have been a member of Regionuli Liga since 2017.  

Zana came 3rd in their group tournament three times in four years, including in 2022, when the team was chasing promotion up until the last match. However, having lost a crucial game, they failed to overcome their two rivals and qualify for playoffs.

This season the club turned out to be the only fifth-division side to have prevailed over four opponents in the Cup campaign and progressed into the round of 16 for the first time in their history.    

The team is also a regular participant of the annual Western Cup competition, organized by the regional Football Federation of Imereti. Zana won it in 2020.

Seasons

Squad
As of September 2022

Stadium
Zana play their home matches at a 1,000 seater stadium named after Mevlud Miminoshvili. Born in Abasha, he was a FIFA referee, working in the Soviet Top League for ten seasons in 1980s.

References

External Links
Profile on Soccerway

Page in Facebook

Football clubs in Georgia (country)
Samegrelo-Zemo Svaneti